A.Mattheis Motorsport (previously called Red Bull Racing), currently competing as Ipiranga Racing due to sponsorship reasons, is a Brazilian auto racing team based in Petropolis, Rio de Janeiro, that currently competes in Stock Car Brasil. The team was sponsored by Red Bull from 2009 to 2016 and is currently sponsored by Brazilian fuel company Ipiranga.

References

External links

See also
 WA Mattheis
 R. Mattheis Motorsport

Stock Car Brasil teams

Auto racing teams established in 1995
1995 establishments in Brazil
Brazilian auto racing teams